The modern pentathlon at the 1984 Summer Olympics was represented by two events: Individual competition and Team competition. As usual in Olympic modern pentathlon, one competition was held and each competitor's score was included to the Individual competition event results table and was also added to his teammates' scores to be included to the Team competition event results table. This competition consisted of 5 disciplines:

Equestrian, held on July 29.
Fencing, held on July 30.
Swimming, held on July 31.
Shooting, held on August 1.
Cross-country, also held on August 1.

The event took place at the Coto Equestrian Center in Southern Orange County, California.

Results

References

External links
Official Olympic Report

1984 Summer Olympics events
1984